In grammar, a reflexive verb is, loosely, a verb whose direct object is the same as its subject; for example, "I wash myself". More generally, a reflexive verb has the same semantic agent and patient (typically represented syntactically by the subject and the direct object). For example, the English verb to perjure is reflexive, since one can only perjure oneself. In a wider sense, the term refers to any verb form whose grammatical object is a reflexive pronoun, regardless of semantics; such verbs are also more broadly referred to as pronominal verbs, especially in grammars of the Romance languages. Other kinds of pronominal verbs are reciprocal (they killed each other), passive (it is told), subjective, idiomatic. The presence of the reflexive pronoun changes the meaning of a verb, e.g. Spanish abonar to pay, abonarse to subscribe.

There are languages that have explicit morphology or syntax to transform a verb into a reflexive form. In many languages, reflexive constructions are rendered by transitive verbs followed by a reflexive pronoun, as in English -self (e.g., "She threw herself to the floor.") English employs reflexive derivation in-idiosyncratically, as in "self-destruct".

Indo-European languages
Romance and Slavic languages make extensive use of reflexive verbs and reflexive forms.

In the Romance languages, there are non-emphatic clitic reflexive pronouns and emphatic ones. In Spanish, for example, the particle se encliticizes to the verb's infinitive, gerund, and imperative (lavarse "to wash oneself"), while in Romanian, the particle procliticizes to the verb (a se spăla "to wash oneself"). Full reflexive pronouns or pronominal phrases are added for emphasis or disambiguation: Me cuido a mí mismo "I take care of myself" (mismo combines with the prepositional form of the pronoun mí to form an intensive reflexive pronoun).

The enclitic reflexive pronoun sa/se/si/się is used in Western and South Slavic languages, while Eastern Slavic languages use the suffix -sja (-ся). There is also the non-clitic emphatic pronoun sebja/себя, used to emphasize the reflexive nature of the act; it is applicable only to "true" reflexive verbs, where the agent performs a (transitive) action on itself.

The Slavic languages use the same reflexive pronoun for all persons and numbers, while the Romance and North Germanic ones have a special third person pronoun that cliticizes and the other Germanic ones do as well without cliticizing. This is illustrated in the following table for the word "to recall" (e.g., Je me souviens means "I recall", Tu te souviens means "You recall", and so on).

In all of these language groups, reflexive forms often present an obstacle for foreign learners (notably native speakers of English, where the feature is practically absent) due to the variety of uses. Even in languages which contain the feature, it is not always applicable to the same verbs and uses (although a common subset can be generally extracted, as outlined below). For example, the Spanish reflexive construct "se hundió el barco" ("the boat sank") has no reflexive equivalent in some Slavic languages (which use an intransitive equivalent of sink), though for example Czech and Slovak do use a reflexive verb: "loď se potopila"/"loď sa potopila".
Reflexive verbs can have a variety of uses and meanings, which often escape consistent classification. Some language-common identified uses are outlined below. For example, Davies et al. identify 12 uses for Spanish reflexive constructions, while Vinogradov divides Russian reflexive verbs into as many as 16 groups.

Martin Haspelmath also has a useful distinction between the reflexive types mentioned below, which he calls introverted reflexives, and so called extroverted reflexives, which are used for verbs that are usually not reflexive, like hate oneself, love oneself, hear oneself, and kill oneself. Some Indo-European languages have a different reflexive morpheme for extroverted reflexives. For example:
See how the Russian ненавидеть себя (nenavidet' sebja) "to hate oneself", which uses a reflexive pronoun, compares to мыться (myt'-sja) "to wash (oneself)", which uses a reflexive suffix (Russian can also say мыть себя (myt' sebja), with a reflexive pronoun, but only when the pronoun needs to be stressed for emphasis or contrast). 
Or Dutch "zij haat zichzelf" "she hates herself", versus "zij wast zich" "she washes (herself)". 
The distinction exists similarly in English, where introverted reflexive verbs usually have no reflexive pronoun, unlike extroverted. 
In ancient Greek, the introverted reflexive was expressed using the middle voice rather than a pronoun. Similarly, in modern Greek, it is expressed using the middle usage of the mediopassive voice. On the other hand, the extroverted reflexive was a true reflexive in ancient Greek and modern Greek. 
Similarly Claire Moyse-Faurie distinguishes between middle and reflexive in Oceanic languages in her on-line articles about reflexives in Oceanic languages.

Properly reflexive
The "true" (literal) reflexive denotes that the agent is simultaneously the patient. The verb is typically transitive and can be used in non-reflexive meaning as well.

Reciprocal

"Reciprocal" reflexive denotes that the agents perform the mutual actions among themselves, as in English constructions using "each other". In most cases, the transitive verbs are also used.

In modern Scandinavian languages, the passive (or more properly mediopassive) voice is used for medial, especially reciprocal, constructions. Some examples from Danish are

Maria og Peter skændes; "Mary and Peter are bickering", lit. "Mary and Peter are scolded by each other."

Maria og Peter blev forlovet; "Mary and Peter got engaged [to each other]."

(The hypothetical form **kysses (kiss each other) is not often—if ever—seen in Danish; however, it will likely be understood by most native speakers, indicating that the mediopassive voice is still at the very least potentially productive in Danish. An expression like "de kysses uafladeligt" (they kiss each other all the time) could very well be used for humorous purposes.)

Autocausative

"Autocausative" reflexive denotes that the (usually animate) "referent represented by the subject combines the activity of actor and undergoes a change of state as a patient":

Anticausative

"Anticausative" reflexive denotes that the (usually inanimate) subject of the verb undergoes an action or change of state whose agent is unclear or nonexistent.

{|class="wikitable"
|-
!Language
!Examples
|-
!Spanish
|La puerta se abrió.
|-
!French
|La porte s'est ouverte.
|-
!Italian
|La porta si aprì.
|-
!Catalan
|La porta es va obrir.
|-
!Galician
|A porta abriuse.
|-
!Serbo-Croatian
|Vrata su se otvorila.
|-
!Slovene
|Vrata so se odprla.
|-
!Polish
|Drzwi się otworzyły.
|-
!Russian
|Дверь открылась.Dver' otkrylas.
|-
!German
|Die Tür öffnete sich.
|-
!Lithuanian
|Durys atsidarė.
|-
!English
|The door opened.
|}

Intransitive or impersonal

"Intransitive" forms (also known as "impersonal reflexive" or "mediopassive") are obtained by attaching the reflexive pronoun to intransitive verbs. The grammatical subject is either omitted (in pro-drop languages) or is a dummy pronoun (otherwise). Thus, those verbs are defective, as they have only the 3rd person singular (masculine or neuter, depending on language) form.

In Slavic languages, practically "the only condition is that they can be construed as having a human agent. The applied human agent can be generic, or loosely specified collective or individual."

In many cases, there is a semantic overlap between impersonal/anticausative/autocausative constructs and the passive voice (also present in all Romance and Slavic languages). On one hand, impersonal reflexive constructs have a wider scope of application, as they are not limited to transitive verbs like the canonical passive voice. On the other hand, those constructs can have slight semantic difference or markedness.

Inherent
"Inherent" or "pronominal" (inherently or essentially) reflexive verbs lack the corresponding non-reflexive from which they can be synchronically derived. In other words, se is an inherent part of an unergative reflexive or reciprocal verb with no meaning of its own, and an obligatory part of the verb's lexical entry":
{|class="wikitable"
|-
!Language
!colspan=4|Examples
|-
!Spanish
|Pedro se arrepintió.
|Pedro se ríe
|María y Pedro se separaron.
|Pedro se queja.
|-
!French
|Pierre s'est repenti.
|Pierre se marre (informal).
|Marie et Pierre se sont séparés.
|Pierre se lamente.
|-
!Italian
|Pietro si pentì.
|
|Maria e Pietro si separarono.
|Pietro si lamenta.
|-
!Catalan
|En Pere es va penedir.
|
|La Maria i en Pere es van separar.
|En Pere es lamenta.
|-
!Galician
|Pedro arrepentiuse.
|
|
|Pedro laméntase.
|-
!Serbo-Croatian
|Petar se pokajao.
|Petar se smije.
|Marija i Petar su se rastali.
|Petar se žali.
|-
!Slovene
|Peter se kesa.
|Peter se smeji.
|Marija in Petar sta se razšla.
|Peter se pritožuje.
|-
!Polish
|Piotr się pokajał.
|Piotr się śmieje.
|Maria i Piotr się rozstali.
|Piotr żali się.
|-
!Russian
|Пётр раскаялся.Pyotr raskayalsya.
|Пётр cмеётся.Pyotr smeyotsya.
|Мария и Пётр расстались.Mariya i Pyotr rasstalis.
|Пётр жалуeтся.Pyotr zhaluyetsya.
|-
!Lithuanian
|Petras atsiprašė.
|Petras juokiasi.
|Marija ir Petras išsiskyrė.
|Petras skundžiasi.
|-
!English
|Peter repented.
|Peter laughs.
|Mary and Peter parted.
|Peter complains.
|}

 Hebrew 
In Hebrew reflexive verbs are in binyan הִתְפַּעֵל. A clause whose predicate is a reflexive verb may never have an object but may have other modifiers. e.g.
 האיש התפטר מעבודתו - the man resigned from his job
 האיש התמכר לסמים - the man got addicted to drugs
 האיש התקלח בבוקר - the man 'showered himself', i.e., took/had a shower in the morning
 האישה הסתפרה אצל אבי - the woman took a haircut/had her hair done at Avi's

 Inuktitut 

 Australian languages 

 Guugu Yimithirr 
In Guugu Yimithirr (a member of the Pama-Nyungan language family) reflexivity can combine with past (PST), nonpast (NPST), and imperative (IMP) tense marking to form the verbal suffixes: /-dhi/ (REFL+PST), /-yi/ (REFL+NPST) and /-ya/ (REFL+IMP) respectively. See the following example where the verb waarmbal, a transitive verb meaning 'send back' is detransitivized to mean 'return' taking only one nominal argument with an agentive role:

The same valence-reduction process occurs for the transitive wagil 'cut'

In each of these cases, the reflexively-inflected verb now forms a new stem to which additional morphology may be affixed, for example waarmba-adhi 'returned' may become waarmba-adhi-lmugu (return-REFL+PST-NEG) 'didn't return.' As with many Pama–Nyungan languages, however, verbs in the lexicon belong to conjugation classes, and a verbs class may restrict the ease with which it can be reflexivized. 

These reflexive morphemes are largely employed for expressing reciprocality as well; however, in cases where there is potential ambiguity between a reflexive and a reciprocal interpretation, Guugu Yimithirr has an additional means for emphasizing the reflexive (i.e. by the agent upon the agent) interpretation: namely, the /-gu/ suffix upon the grammatical subject. See for example the following contrast between the reciprocal and reflexive:

Reciprocal

Reflexive

Gumbaynggir 
Another Pama–Nyungan language, Gumbaynggir has a verbal suffix /-iri/ to mark reciprocality and de-transitivize transitive verbs e.g.

Kuuk Thaayorre 
As with Guugu Yimithirr, Kuuk Thaayorre, a Paman language, has some ambiguity between reflexive and reciprocal morphemes and constructions. Ostensibly, there are two suffixes /-e/ and /-rr/ for reflexivity and reciprocality respectively; however, in practice it is less clear cut. Take for example the presence of the reciprocal suffix in what should seem like a simple reflexive example.

Or the reverse wherein an apparent reciprocal assertion has reflexive morphology

In actuality, the broader function of the reciprocal verb is to emphasize the agentivity of the grammatical subject(s), sometimes to directly counteract expectations of an external agent--as in the first example above. The combination of the reciprocal verb with the reflexive pronoun highlights the notion that the subject acted highly agentively (as in a mutual/symmetric reciprocal event) but was also the undergoer of their own action (as in a reflexive event where agentivity is backgrounded e.g. "I soiled myself"). 

Conversely, the reflexive verb can have precisely this function of backgrounding the agentivity of the subject and bringing the focus to the effect that was wrought upon the undergoer(s) as in the second example above.

Uralic languages

Hungarian language 
"The door opened" is expressed in Hungarian as "Az ajtó kinyílt", from the verb kinyílik, while the passive voice is rare and archaic. There are numerous verb pairs where one element is active and the other expresses middle voice, something happening apparently on its own, rendered in English like "to become, get, grow, turn" (something). See also the grammatical voice of Hungarian verbs and the Wiktionary entries of -ul/-ül, -ódik/-ődik and -odik/-edik/-ödik, three suffix groups that form such verbs.

See also 

 Deponent verb
 Passive voice
 Reciprocal (grammar)
 Reciprocal pronoun
 Reflexive pronoun

References

External links

Transitivity and valency